The 2010 California Superintendent of Public Instruction election occurred on November 2, 2010. Incumbent Jack O'Connell was term-limited and unable to run for re-election to a third term.

In the nonpartisan primary election on June 8, 2010, no candidate received a majority of the votes. The top two finishers, Larry Aceves, who came first with 19% of the vote, and Democratic State Assemblyman Tom Torlakson, who came second with 18.5% of the vote, advanced to the general election. In the general election on November 2, 2010, Torlakson defeated Aceves.

Primary election

Candidates
 Larry Aceves, former Superintendent of the Franklin-McKinley School District and of the Alum Rock Union Elementary School District
 Karen Blake, geologist
 Alexia Deligianni, Board member of the Orange Unified School District
 Lydia Gutierrez, teacher
 Diane Lenning, teacher and businesswoman
 Leonard James Martin, retired
 Grant McMicken, teacher
 Daniel Nusbaum, teacher
 Gloria Romero, State Senator
 Faarax Dahir Sheikh-Noor
 Tom Torlakson, State Assemblyman
 Henry Williams, professor

Results

General election

Candidates
 Larry Aceves, former Superintendent of the Franklin-McKinley School District and of the Alum Rock Union Elementary School District
 Tom Torlakson, State Assemblyman

Results

See also
 California elections, 2010
 California Department of Education

References

External links
Candidate information
VoteCircle.com Non-partisan resources & vote sharing network for Californians
Information on the elections from California's Secretary of State

2010 California elections
California Superintendent of Public Instruction elections
California